The 2008 Euroleague Final Four was the final phase Euroleague Final Four tournament of the Euroleague 2007–08 season, featuring four teams that survived a 14-game Regular Season, 6 games in the Top 16 phase, and a best-of-three quarterfinal. It was played on May 2 and May 4 in Madrid at the Community of Madrid Sports Palace.

As in previous years, the EuroLeague Final Four involved four games. The first day featured the two semifinal matches. The final day started with the third-place game between the semifinal losers, followed by the EuroLeague Final.

The EuroLeague champions were Russian power CSKA Moscow. They established new records for the EuroLeague era, with their sixth consecutive Final Four appearance, and third consecutive final game appearance. The title, their sixth overall, put them second in all-time European titles to Real Madrid. CSKA's Trajan Langdon was named EuroLeague Final Four MVP.

Arena 
The host venue was the 15,000 capacity Palacio de Deportes de la Comunidad de Madrid. Opened in 2005, it stands on the site of a previous arena that was built in 1960, and destroyed by fire in 2001.

Final four

Bracket

Semifinals

Montepaschi Siena - Maccabi Tel Aviv 

Game Stats, 1st semi-final Montepaschi Siena

Notes: # - Player number; Min played - Minutes played; Points - FT: Free Throws, 2FG: 2-point Field Goals, 3FG: 3-point Field Goals, TOT: Total points; Rebounds - Off: Offensive, Def: Defensive, TOT: Total rebounds; Blocks - Fv: In Favor, Ag: Against; Fouls - Cm: Committed, Rv: Received; Players in bold were starters

 Maccabi Tel Aviv

Notes: # - Player number; Min played - Minutes played; Points - FT: Free Throws, 2FG: 2-point Field Goals, 3FG: 3-point Field Goals, TOT: Total points; Rebounds - Off: Offensive, Def: Defensive, TOT: Total rebounds; Blocks - Fv: In Favor, Ag: Against; Fouls - Cm: Committed, Rv: Received; Players in bold were starters

Baskonia – CSKA Moscow

Third Place game 

Game Stats, 3rd place game Montepaschi Siena

Notes: # - Player number; Min played - Minutes played; Points - FT: Free Throws, 2FG: 2-point Field Goals, 3FG: 3-point Field Goals, TOT: Total points; Rebounds - Off: Offensive, Def: Defensive, TOT: Total rebounds; Blocks - Fv: In Favor, Ag: Against; Fouls - Cm: Committed, Rv: Received; Players in bold were starters

 Baskonia

Notes: # - Player number; Min played - Minutes played; Points - FT: Free Throws, 2FG: 2-point Field Goals, 3FG: 3-point Field Goals, TOT: Total points; Rebounds - Off: Offensive, Def: Defensive, TOT: Total rebounds; Blocks - Fv: In Favor, Ag: Against; Fouls - Cm: Committed, Rv: Received; Players in bold were starters

Championship game

Awards

Euroleague Final Four MVP 
  Trajan Langdon ( CSKA Moscow)

Euroleague Finals Top Scorer 
  Will Bynum ( Maccabi Tel Aviv)

External links 
 EuroLeague

Final Four
2007-08
2007–08 in Spanish basketball
2007–08 in Russian basketball
2007–08 in Italian basketball
2007–08 in Israeli basketball
International basketball competitions hosted by Spain
Sports competitions in Madrid
2008 in Madrid